3 Paoni - Coptic calendar - 5 Paoni

Fixed commemorations
All fixed commemorations below are observed on 4 Paoni (11 June) by the Coptic Orthodox Church.

Saints
Saint Sanusi
Saint Amun the Martyr and Saint Sophia
Saint John of Heraclea
Saint Hor
Pope John VIII of Alexandria (1036 A.M.), (1320 A.D.)

References
Coptic Synexarion

Days of the Coptic calendar